Boab Prison Tree  can refer to two Boab trees in the Kimberley, Western Australia, that are known as "Prison Trees":-

 Boab Prison Tree, Derby
 Boab Prison Tree, Wyndham